Barygenys maculata is a species of frog in the family Microhylidae.
It is endemic to Papua New Guinea.
Its natural habitat is subtropical or tropical moist montane forests.
It is threatened by habitat loss.

References

Barygenys
Amphibians of Papua New Guinea
Amphibians described in 1977
Taxonomy articles created by Polbot